Sergey Ivanovich Aksenenko (born 1967) is a Soviet Ukrainian politician, writer and journalist. He has served as a member of Parliament of Ukraine from 1994 till 1998. He is a member of the Communist Party of Ukraine (since 1992).

Biography 
He graduated from the University of Luhansk in 1991.
He served in the Soviet Army from 1985 to 1987, received the rank of sergeant.

He has published a number of books.

From May 1994 to May 1998 - People's Deputy of Ukraine - Lutuhyne Constituency № 254, Luhansk region. Chairman of the Subcommittee on Audiovisual Mass Media of the Committee on Legislative Freedom of Speech and Mass Media.

In 1995-1998 he was the Chairman of the Temporary Commission of Inquiry of the Verkhovna Rada of Ukraine on the Study of the Situation in the Television and Radio Information Space of Ukraine.

From March 16, 1999 to June 11, 1999 - Member of the National Council of Ukraine on Television and Radio Broadcasting (from the Verkhovna Rada of Ukraine), from June 11, 1999 to April 20, 2000 - Authorized Member, Acting Chairman of the National Council of Ukraine on Television and Radio Broadcasting.

Delegate to the All-Ukrainian Conference (March 1993) and the CPU Reconstruction Congress (June 1993).

References 

1967 births
Living people
Ukrainian writers
Second convocation members of the Verkhovna Rada
University of Luhansk alumni